Vinckeia is a subgenus of the genus Plasmodium — all of which are parasitic alveolates. The subgenus Vinckeia was created by Cyril Garnham in 1964 to accommodate the mammalian parasites other than those infecting the primates.

Diagnostic features 

Species in this subgenus infect mammals other than the higher primates. 
Species infecting lemurs have since been included in this subgenus. This classification may not be correct.

Schizonts: These do not fill the erythrocyte and do not show true stippling. They give rise normally to 8 or fewer merozoites. Schizogony normally takes three days or less.

Merozoites:

Gametocytes: These are spherical.

Species in this subgenus 

The following is a list of species in subgenus Vinckeia and their hosts.

Plasmodium achromaticum — insectivorous bat species
Plasmodium aegyptensis — African grass rat (Arvicanthis niloticus)
Plasmodium anomaluri — African flying squirrel (Anomalurus species)
Plasmodium atheruri — African brush-tailed porcupine (Atherurus africanus), Large vesper mouse (Calomys callosus) and Mongolian gerbil (Meriones unguiculatus), Anopheles stephensi
Plasmodium berghei — the African woodland thicket rat (Grammomys surdaster), Anopheles stephensi
Plasmodium booliati — the Malayan giant flying squirrel Petaurista petaurista
Plasmodium bouillize
Plasmodium brodeni — four-toed elephant shrews (Petrodromus tetradactylus)
Plasmodium bubalis — water buffaloes (Bubalus bubalis)
Plasmodium bucki
Plasmodium caprae — domestic goat (Capra hircus)
Plasmodium cephalophi — the antelope (Cephalophus grimmi) and the common duiker/grey duiker (Sylvicapra grimmia)
Plasmodium cercopitheci
Plasmodium chabaudi — Anopheles stephensi
Plasmodium coulangesi
Plasmodium cyclopsi — the Cyclops roundleaf bat (Hipposideros cyclops)
Plasmodium foleyi
Plasmodium girardi
Plasmodium incertae — flying squirrel
Plasmodium inopinatum
Plasmodium joyeuxi
Plasmodium landauae — African flying squirrels (Anomalurus species)
Plasmodium lemuris
Plasmodium melanipherum — the common bent-wing bat/Schreibers' bat (Miniopterus schreibersii)
Plasmodium narayani
Plasmodium odocoilei — white-tailed deer (Odocoileus virginianus)
Plasmodium percygarnhami
Plasmodium pulmophilium — African flying squirrel (Anomalurus species)
Plasmodium sandoshami — the Sunda flying lemur (Galeopterus variegatus)
Plasmodium semnopitheci
Plasmodium traguli — mouse deer
Plasmodium tyrio — the Chinese pangolin (Manis pentadactyla)
Plasmodium uilenbergi
Plasmodium vinckei  rodents
Plasmodium voltaicum — the Angolan rousette (a fruit bat, Myonycteris angolensis/Rousettus smithi)
Plasmodium watteni — Formosan giant flying squirrel (Petaurista petaurista grandis)
Plasmodium yoelii — Anopheles stephensi

Evolutionary history
Sharp et al 2020 reanalyze the available amino acid substitution data and conclude that chabaudi, yoelii, and berghei cluster relatively close together. Further they find chabaudi split off first and the berghei/yoelii division is more recent.

By host

Murine malaria 
Murine malaria  malaria in mice  is caused by P. berghei, P. chabaudi, P. vinckei and P. yoelii. Some strains produce cerebral malaria and some do not.

References 

Plasmodium subgenera